Takashi Yamaguchi is a Japanese actor. In 1966, he received the Elan d'or Award for Newcomer of the Year.

Filmography

Television
Taiga drama
 Minamoto no Yoshitsune (1966)
 Ten to Chi to (1969)
 Kaze to Kumo to Niji to (1976) as Taira no Sadamori
 Haru no Hatō (1985) as Kaneko Kentarō
 Genroku Ryoran (1999) as Ōno Kurobei 
Ōoka Echizen (1970–2006) as Tokugawa Yoshimune
Tenka Gomen (1970)
Shinsho Taikōki (1973) as Toyotomi Hideyoshi
Kiso Kaido Isogitabi (1973) 
Naruto Hichō (1978) as Hiraga Gennai
On'yado Kawasemi (1980–83) 
Furuhata Ninzaburo (1994)
Shin On'yado Kawasemi (2013)

Film
 Natsukashi Furaibo (1966)
 Fumō Chitai (1976)
 Bandits vs. Samurai Squadron (1978)
 Konokowo Nokoshite (1983)
 Hit Me Anyone One More Time (2019)

References

External links
NHK 人物録　山口崇

1936 births
Japanese male film actors
Japanese male television actors
20th-century Japanese male actors
Japanese male stage actors
Living people